The 2003 Brickyard 400, the 10th running of the event, was a NASCAR Winston Cup Series race held on August 3, 2003 at Indianapolis Motor Speedway in Speedway, Indiana. Contested at 160 laps on the 2.5 mile (4.023 km) speedway, it was the twenty-first race of the 2003 NASCAR Winston Cup Series season. Kevin Harvick of Richard Childress Racing won the race.

Kevin Harvick became the first driver to win the race from the pole position.

Background

The Indianapolis Motor Speedway, located in Speedway, Indiana, (an enclave suburb of Indianapolis) in the United States, is the home of the Indianapolis 500 and the Brickyard 400. The track's turns are banked at 9 degrees, while the front stretch, the location of the finish line, has no banking. The back stretch, opposite of the front, also has a zero degree banking. The racetrack has seats for more than 250,000 spectators.

Race results

Failed to Quaify
11 - Brett Bodine
79 - Billy Bigley (R)
49 - Ken Schrader
71 - Jim Sauter
43 - Christian Fittipaldi (R)
04 - David Reutimann
07 - Ted Musgrave
02 - Hermie Sadler
4 - Robert Pressley
89 - Morgan Shepherd (withdrew)

Race statistics
 Time of race: 2:58:22
 Average Speed: 
 Pole Speed: 184.343
 Cautions: 5 for 25 laps
 Margin of Victory: 2.758 sec
 Lead changes: 17
 Percent of race run under caution: 15.6%         
 Average green flag run: 22.5 laps

References

Brickyard 400
Brickyard 400
NASCAR races at Indianapolis Motor Speedway
August 2003 sports events in the United States